Joseph Milner may refer to:
 Joseph Milner (priest)
 Joseph Milner (firefighter)
 Joseph Milner (cricketer)

See also
 California Joe Milner, American miner and frontier scout